The Tyrol Schistose Alps (Tiroler Schieferalpen in German) is the proposed name for a subdivision of mountain ranges in a new, and as yet unadopted, classification of the Alps, located in Austria.

Geography 
Administratively the range belongs to the Austrian state of Tyrol and, marginally, of Salzburg.
The whole range is drained by the tributaries of the Danube river.

SOIUSA classification 
According to SOIUSA (International Standardized Mountain Subdivision of the Alps) the mountain range is an Alpine section, classified in the following way:
 main part = Eastern Alps
 major sector = Northern Limestone Alps
 section = Tyrol Schistose Alps
 code = II/B-23

Subdivision 
The range is divided in two Alpine subsections:
 Tux Alps (DE:Tuxer Alpen) - SOIUSA code:II/B-23.I;
 Kitzbühel Alps (DE:Kitzbüheler Alpen) - SOIUSA code:II/B-23.II.

Notable summits

Some notable summits of the range are:

References

Mountain ranges of the Alps
Mountain ranges of Tyrol (state)
Mountain ranges of Salzburg (state)